The Epsom Handicap is an Australian Turf Club Group 1 Thoroughbred horse race for horses three years old and older, under handicap conditions over a distance of 1,600 metres at Randwick Racecourse, Sydney, Australia in early October. Prize money is A$1,500,000.

History

In 1897 Jim McHugh weighing  and aged 11 years and 4 months was having his second race ride ever, on Robin Hood in the Epsom Handicap and won the race.

Jockey, Donald Nicholson won the race in succession five times from 1880 to 1884 and came fifth in 1885. He was killed a few weeks later when his mount fell in the 1885 Caulfield Cup.

It is one of the major races of the ATC Spring Carnival. Many great milers have won the race, including Chatham, Gunsynd, and  Super Impose, who was also a dual winner of the autumn equivalent, the Doncaster Handicap.

Name

The race was named after the famous Epsom Downs Racecourse in the South of England where the classic three-year-old Epsom Derby has been contested since 1780.

Grade
 1865–1978 - Principal Race
 1979 onwards - Group 1

Distance
 1865–1878 - 1 mile (~1600 metres)
 1879–1884 - 1 miles (~1800 metres)
 1885–1971 - 1 mile (~1600 metres)
 1972–2000 – 1600 metres
 2001 – 1400 metres (run at Randwick's inner course known as the Kensington)
 2002 onwards - 1600 metres

Venue
 1865–1982 - Randwick Racecourse
 1983 - Warwick Farm Racecourse
 1984 onwards - Randwick Racecourse

1934 & 1954 racebooks

Winners

 2022 - † Ellsberg / Top Ranked
 2021 - Private Eye
 2020 - Probabeel
 2019 - Kolding
 2018 - Hartnell
 2017 - Happy Clapper
 2016 - Hauraki
 2015 - Winx
 2014 - He's Your Man
 2013 - Boban
 2012 - Fat Al
 2011 - Secret Admirer
 2010 - Captain Sonador
 2009 - Rock Kingdom
 2008 - Theseo
 2007 - ‡race not held
 2006 - Racing To Win
 2005 - Desert War
 2004 - Desert War
 2003 - Clangalang
 2002 - Excellerator
 2001 - Final Fantasy
 2000 - Shogun Lodge
 1999 - Allez Suez
 1998 - Dodge
 1997 - Iron Horse
 1996 - Filante
 1995 - Nick's Joy
 1994 - Navy Seal
 1993 - Golden Sword
 1992 - Kinjite
 1991 - Super Impose
 1990 - Super Impose
 1989 - From The Planet
 1988 - Regal Native
 1987 - Sound Horizon
 1986 - Chanteclair
 1985 - Magnitude
 1984 - Riverdale
 1983 - Cool River
 1982 - Dalmacia
 1981 - Gold Circle
 1980 - Bold Diplomat
 1979 - Imposing
 1978 - Leonotis
 1977 - Raffindale
 1976 - La Neige
 1975 - Authentic Heir
 1974 - Citadel
 1973 - Lord Nelson
 1972 - Triton
 1971 - Gunsynd
 1970 - Ricochet
 1969 - Broker's Tip
 1968 - Speed Of Sound
 1967 - Cabochon
 1966 - Chantal
 1965 - Even Better
 1964 - Toi Port
 1963 - Toi Port
 1962 - Rochdale 
 1961 - Sky High
 1960 - Ma Cherie
 1959 - Noholme
 1958 - Turkestan
 1957 - Timor
 1956 - Knave
 1955 - Hans
 1954 - Connaught
 1953 - Silver Phantom
 1952 - High Law
 1951 - Davey Jones
 1950 - Achilles
 1949 - Denali
 1948 - De La Salle
 1947 - Titanic
 1946 - Blue Legend
 1945 - Shannon
 1944 - Modulation
 1943 - Kiaree
 1942 - Freckles
 1941 - Rimveil
 1940 - High Caste
 1939 - Geebung
 1938 - King's Head
 1937 - Gold Rod
 1936 - Capris
 1935 - Synagogue
 1934 - Silver Ring
 1933 - Chatham
 1932 - Chatham
 1931 - Autopay
 1930 - Cathmar
 1929 - Nightmarch
 1928 - Amounis
 1927 - Vaals
 1926 - Amounis
 1925  - †Boaster / Metellus
 1924  - Blackadder
 1923  - Claro
 1922  - Rostrum
 1921  - Beauford
 1920  - Greenstead
 1919  - Wolaroi
 1918  - Rebus
 1917  - Satin Bird
 1916  - Panacre
 1915  - Woorak
 1914  - Portrush
 1913  - Aleconner
 1912  - Hartfell      
 1911  - Volsloane
 1910  - Silver Hampton
 1909  - Hyman
 1908  - Melodrama
 1907  - Melodrama
 1906  - Maximize
 1905  - Sleeper
 1904  - Contest
 1903  - Famous
 1902  - Air Motor
 1901  - Sequence
 1900  - Ampier
 1899  - Djin Djin
 1898  - Alemene
 1897  - Robin Hood
 1896  - Steward
 1895  - Hopscotch
 1894  - Uabba
 1893  - Brockleigh
 1892  - Daredevil
 1891  - Marvel
 1890  - Bungebah
 1889  - Novice
 1888  - Stockwell
 1887  - Phaon
 1886  - Zeno
 1885  - Folly
 1884  - Espiegle
 1883  - Masquerade
 1882  - Masquerade
 1881  - Waxy
 1880  - Master Avenel
 1879  - Sweetmeat
 1878  - Viscount
 1877  - Eva
 1876  - Malta
 1875  - Evangeline
 1874  - Westminster
 1873  - †Atalanta / Kingfisher
 1872  - The Count
 1871  - Captain Cook
 1870  - Deceptive
 1869  - Circassian
 1868  - Phoebe
 1867  - Birmingham
 1866  - Rapidan
 1865  - Dundee

† Dead heat
‡ Not held because of outbreak of equine influenza

See also
 List of Australian Group races
 Group races

References

Open mile category horse races
Group 1 stakes races in Australia
Randwick Racecourse